Eoghan Stokes (born 17 May 1996) is an Irish professional footballer who last played as an attacking midfielder for Scottish League One side Dumbarton. He has previously played for Leeds United, Bohemians, Derry City, Cork City, Airdrieonians and is also a former Republic of Ireland U19 international. He can also play as a forward.

Career

Leeds United
After being spotted playing for St Kevins Boys in Ireland, Stokes was signed by Leeds United in 2012, where he graduated through their academy, he was given his Leeds United first team debut on 22 August 2017, when he started for Leeds in a 5–1 League Cup victory against Newport County.

On 1 February 2018, Leeds announced they had terminated the contract of Stokes by mutual consent. On 2 February 2018, Leeds Head Coach Thomas Christiansen revealed that he felt Stokes would be set to join a League 1 or League 2 level club after his release.

Bohemians
Stokes joined League of Ireland Premier Division side Bohemians on 15 February 2018. He appeared the next day against Shamrock Rovers as Bohs won 3–1 on the opening night of the 2018 season, but was on the bench. On 24 February 2018, Stokes scored his first goal for Bohemians in a 1-1 draw against Limerick. Over the season, Stokes played 39 games in all competitions for Bohs, scoring 8 goals including one away to Shamrock Rovers in the Dublin Derby.

During the off season, he spent time on trial with Boavista of the Primeira Liga, Portugal's top flight. Stokes decided not to proceed with Boavista, and returned to Ireland.

Derry City
Stokes signed for Derry City on 5 February 2019 alongside Argentinian midfielder Gerardo Bruna. He scored on his debut 10 days later in a 3–0 win over newly promoted UCD on the opening night of the season. After 4 goals in 21 appearances in al competitions, Stokes departed Derry City on deadline day of the summer transfer window.

Cork City
Stokes signed for Cork City on 31 July 2019, given the number 7 shirt. He made his debut on 2 August 2019 against St Patrick's Athletic. It was announced on 7 November that Stokes had been released by Cork after failing to score in his 13 appearances for the club.

Airdrieonians
On the 20th August 2020, Stokes signed for Scottish League One side Airdrieonians. Upon signing for the club, Stokes looked to clarify to the club's supporters that his position has mainly been in an attacking midfield role and not a striker as widely reported. He made his debut for the club on the 7th October 2020 in a 2–0 Scottish League Cup loss to Alloa Athletic and remained at the club until May 2021, having made 13 appearances for the club.

Dumbarton 
After leaving Airdrieonians, Stokes joined Scottish League One side Dumbarton in June 2021. He scored his first goal for the club on the 11th August 2021 in a 3–2 defeat at home to Rangers B in the Scottish Challenge Cup, his first goal since 2019. Stokes scored five goals in nine starts and 20 substitute appearances for the Sons, before being released by the club in May 2022 following their relegation to Scottish League Two.

International career
Stokes has represented Ireland at various levels including up to Republic of Ireland U19's level.

Career statistics

References

1996 births
Living people
People from Leixlip
Sportspeople from County Kildare
Republic of Ireland youth international footballers
Association football forwards
Leeds United F.C. players
Bohemian F.C. players
Derry City F.C. players
Cork City F.C. players
Irish expatriate sportspeople in England
Republic of Ireland association footballers
Airdrieonians F.C. players
League of Ireland players
Scottish Professional Football League players
Expatriate footballers in Scotland
Republic of Ireland expatriate association footballers
Irish expatriate sportspeople in Scotland